Paipra Radhakrishnan is a Malayalam writer, columnist, editor and cultural observer. He was the Secretary of Kerala Sahitya Akademi during the period 1991-1995. He is the president of Akshaya Pusthaka Nidhi, and Director, Arshavidyapeedom. He writes the  much acclaimed cultural critic column Aazhchavettom in Kalakaumudi weekly. He has authored many books of short stories, essays, and children's literature. He represented Kerala in many international and national literary events and book festivals.

Personal life

Paipra Radhakrishnan was born in a small village of Paipra, in Ernakulam district to Vadakkanchery Akathoottu Bhargavi Kunjamma and Methala Thattayath Puthankottayil Neelakandan Karthav. He completed his studies from Govt. UPS, Paipra and GHS Cheruvattoor, Sree Sankara Vidyapeetom, Maharaja's College, Ernakulam, and NSS Training College, Changanassery. He worked in various Civil Supplies Department and Public Education Department, Govt. of Kerala. He retired from Govt. service as High School Teacher from Govt. HSS, Methala during the year 2007. His wife Nalini Bekal is a famous novelist and writer in Malayalam. They have two daughter, Dr. Anuradha Dilip works as Ayurveda Medical Officer and Anuja Akathoottu is agricultural economist by profession. Anuja writes poems in Malayalam and published two books, Pothuvakya Sammelanam and Aromayude Vastrangal and won many state level poetry awards.

Posts held
 Secretary, Kerala Sahitya Academy
 President, Akshaya Pusthakanidhi
 Founder Secretary, Kathasamithi
 Member, Kerala-Lakshwadeep Text Book Committee
 Director, Arsha Vidyapeedom
 Editorial Board Member, Guruvayoor Devaswom
 Hon. Chief Editor, Shree Bhagavathy Magazine
 Consultant Editor, Rubber Magazine, Rubber Board 
 Consultant Editor, Indian Nalikera Journal, Coconut Development Board
 Consultant Editor, Rajaveedhi, Public Works Department, Kerala

Works

 Short Story Collections
 kathuvacha Maunam
 Alaathachakram
 Penthookkam
 Thiranjedutha Kathakal

 Novels
 Velipaadukal

 Children's Literature

 Prakaasham parathunnavar
 Gurudakshina
 Uthankan

 Essays
 Vilkaaund Swakaryathakal
 Nanmathinmakalude Pathayam

 Editor

 Paipra; Innale, Innu
 Kera Shabda Kosham

Awards and recognitions

 Prof. Joseph Mundassery State Award
 Bala Sahitya State Award
 Ramavriksha Banipuri National Award
 Khasak Award
 Gurusrekshta Award
 Fellowship, Cultural Department, Govt. of India

Activities and news reports
Sreebhagavathy Vidyarambham special Release

References

External links
 Shillong Times
 Meghalaya Sree Narayana Guru function
 Paipra Desham Facebook Page

1952 births
Living people
People from Ernakulam district
Indian children's writers
20th-century Indian short story writers
20th-century Indian essayists